Fort Edward could refer to:

Canada

 Fort Edward (Nova Scotia), a military fort located in Windsor, Nova Scotia
 Fort Edward (Prince Edward Island), a military fort located in Charlottetown, Prince Edward Island

South Africa

 Fort Edward (South Africa), a military fort established in the Spelonken area of the northern Transvaal region

United States

 Fort Edward (town), New York, a town in New York
 Fort Edward (village), New York, a village in New York

See also 

 Fort Edwards (disambiguation)